Giuseppe Volpi, 1st Count of Misrata (19 November 1877 – 16 November 1947) was an Italian businessman and politician.

Count Volpi developed utilities which brought electricity to Venice, northeast Italy, and the Balkans by 1903. In 1911–1912, he acted as a negotiator in ending the Italo-Turkish War. He was the governor of the colony of Tripolitania from 1921 until 1925.

As the Kingdom of Italy's Minister of Finance from 1925 until 1928, Volpi successfully negotiated Italy's World War I debt repayment with the United States and with the United Kingdom, pegged the value of the lira to the value of gold, and implemented free trade policies. He was replaced in July 1928 by Antonio Mosconi.

Volpi also founded the Venice Film Festival. His son was automobile racing manager Giovanni Volpi. His grand daughter is Countess Maria Cicogna, The New York Times describes her as "the first major female Italian film producer" and "one of the most powerful women in European cinema".

Volpi was president of the Confindustria from 1934 to 1943. He was removed from this position and expelled from the Grand Council of Fascism after he opposed the continuing of the war and Italy's alliance with Hitler. He was arrested by the SS after trying to escape to Switzerland. 

Volpi who was a leading figure of the National Fascist Party, underwent a series of legal proceedings for his responsibilities during the fascist regime after the war. His illness prevented him from appearing before the judges, but, thanks to the Togliatti amnesty he was acquitted of all charges, after a life spent at the top of the Fascist Party.

See also

 Palazzo D'Anna Viaro Martinengo Volpi di Misurata
 Armando Brasini

Notes

External links
 
 

1877 births
1947 deaths
Counts of Italy
Italian nobility
People of former Italian colonies
Mussolini Cabinet
Finance ministers of Italy
Businesspeople from Venice
Politicians from Venice
Film festival founders
Italian people of the Italo-Turkish War
Presidents of Confindustria
Italian colonial governors and administrators
National Fascist Party politicians
19th-century Italian businesspeople